The Magnificent Fraud is a 1939 American crime film directed by Robert Florey and starring Akim Tamiroff, Lloyd Nolan, Mary Boland and Patricia Morison.

Plot

Akim Tamiroff plays an actor performing in a nameless Latin American country who is pressed into service when the president is fatally injured by a bomb.  Impersonating the president, the actor balances the pleasures and temptations of office, dangerous palace intrigue, and his duty to the people of the country.

The plot is identical to the 1988 Richard Dreyfuss film Moon over Parador; both are based on a short story by Charles G. Booth called "Caviar for His Excellency".

Parts of the film were shot in Balboa Park in San Diego.

Cast
 Akim Tamiroff as Jules LaCroix / President Alvarado
 Lloyd Nolan as Sam Barr
 Mary Boland as Mme. Geraldine Genet
 Patricia Morison as Claire Hill
 Ralph Forbes as Harrison Todd
 Steffi Duna as Carmelita
 Ernest Cossart as Duval
 George Zucco as Dr. Luis Virgo
 Robert Warwick as General Pablo Hernandez
 Frank Reicher as Mendietta Garcia
 Robert Middlemass as Morales
 Abner Biberman as Ruiz
 Donald Gallaher as Dr. Diaz

Production
George Raft had meant to play the lead but he refused the part so Lloyd Nolan replaced him. This had also happened on St Louis Blues. The disagreement led to Raft and Paramount parting ways.

See also
Moon over Parador
Dave (film)

References

External links 
 

1939 films
Films directed by Robert Florey
Paramount Pictures films
1939 crime drama films
American crime drama films
Films set in South America
American black-and-white films
1930s American films
1930s English-language films